The 2012 Baton Rouge mayoral election was held on November 6, 2012, to elect the mayor-president of Baton Rouge, Louisiana. It saw the reelection of incumbent mayor-president Kip Holden. Since Holden won an outright majority in the first round, no runoff was necessitated.

Results

References 

2012 Louisiana elections
2012
Baton Rouge